The Alhambra Cup was a football competition played for two seasons between clubs in the Irish League in 1921-22 and 1922-23. Six teams entered each season: Cliftonville, Distillery, Glenavon, Glentoran, Linfield and Queen's Island.

Final results

Sources
Malcolm Brodie, "100 Years of Irish Football", Blackstaff Press, Belfast (1980)

References

External links
Irish League Archive - Alhambra Cup

Defunct association football cup competitions in Northern Ireland